Claude Bourbonnais (born June 24, 1965), is a former driver in the Toyota Atlantic, Indy Lights, and CART Championship Car series.  He raced in the 1994 CART series with 5 starts.  He also raced in the 1997 Indianapolis 500, which by then had become part of the Indy Racing League, completing 9 laps and finishing in 30th position.

He was the Toyota Atlantic teammate of fellow French-Canadian and future Formula One world champion Jacques Villeneuve in 1993 and in fact finished ahead of Villeneuve in series points.

He has been working for major car manufacturer in USA doing demonstration drives and was also a driver coach in the American Ferrari Challenge.

Career

Early career
Bourbonnais first appeared on the national Canadian racing circuits in 1983. The Canadian was introduced to racing by his father, who raced snowmobiles. Bourbonnais raced in the Formula 125 superkart series. Scoring several podium finishes the Kali kart driver finished fifth in the Quebec championship standings. The Quebec native dominated the following season winning all but two races. Most notably Bourbonnais won the Formula 125 race supporting the 1984 Canadian Grand Prix at Circuit Gilles Villeneuve.

Following superkarts, Bourbonnais raced in the national Formula Ford 2000 series in Canada. In his debut season Bourbonnais best result was a second place at Circuit Trois-Rivières, behind Dutchman Cor Euser. The Canadian driver finished one point shy of the top ten in the drivers championship. In 1986 Bourbonnais improved one championship position after exchanging his Reynard 83SF for a more recent Swift DB3. The Quebecois driver also competed in the inaugural season of the Rothmans Porsche Challenge Series in 1986. His best result was a sixth place at Circuit Mont-Tremblant. After switching from the Swift DB3 into a Reynard 87SF, Bourbonnais started winning races in the 1987 Canadian Formula Ford 2000 series. The Canadian won at Mont-Tremblant improving to third in the championship standings. Retaining the 87SF for 1988 and 1989 Bourbonnais became a double champion. In 1988 Bourbonnais won six out of eight races. The following season Bourbonnais scored six race wins out of nine races. The Canadian defeated many up and coming talents such as Jimmy Vasser and Ken Murillo For 1988 the Canadian also appeared in the U.S. based, SCCA sanctioned, Formula Continental class. The Canadian qualified for the SCCA National Championship Runoffs winning the race. Bourbonnais was the first to do so in a Formula Ford 2000 chassis, as previous editions of the Formula Continental race were won by Formula Super Vee chassis. Bourbonnais won the race from pole position, also setting the fastest race lap. Curtis Farley finished second, more than nine seconds behind Bourbonnais.

After his 1988 success, Bourbonnais stepped up to the highly popular Formula Atlantic series. Racing in the Atlantic division, opposed to the Pacific debut, Bourbonnais impressed at his debut. In his first Atlantic race, at Lime Rock Park, Bourbonnais won from pole position. The driver, racing a Swift DB4, finished third in the final standings. Improving the following year Bourbonnais won two races. He was the fastest driver at Heartland Park Topeka and again at Lime Rock Park. As Brian Till won three races, Bourbonnais finished second in the championship standings.

Racing in Europe
Bourbonnais also tried his luck racing in Europe. The Canadian attempted to race in the final two rounds of the 1990 International Formula 3000 Championship. At the Bugatti Circuit 34 drivers tried to qualify for the 25 racing spots. Bourbonnais set the 29th fastest time, therefore he did not qualify for the race. A second attempt came at Circuit Paul Armagnac. Again Bourbonnais failed to qualify. Both times Bourbonnais drove Pacific Racing entered Lola T90/50 cars powered by Mugen Honda engines.

For 1991 Bourbonnais signed with Courage Competition to race in the 1991 World Sportscar Championship. The team ran a Cougar C26S which contested the C2 class, for cars built according to 1991 Group C regulations. At the 1991 430 km of Monza the Canadian made his debut alongside Michel Trollé. The duo finished tenth overall. At the 24 Hours of Le Mans the team was joined by Marco Brand. The team retired after 293 laps.

Return to the U.S.
In 1992 Bourbonnais had his racing season split between the U.S. and Great Britain. In the Atlantic Championship Bourbonnais raced at the Canadian rounds of the now unified championship. The Canadian finished thirteenth at Montreal and seventh at Trois-Rivieres. The fast racer also ran a partial British Formula 3000 in 1992. After a third place at Donington Park Bourbonnais was forced out of the series due to a lack of sponsors.

Having secured enough funding, provided by Player's cigarettes, Bourbonnais returned to the Atlantic Championship in 1993. The Forsythe/Green Racing entered driver won seven races. In the end Bourbonnais was beaten to the championship by only four points to fellow Canadian David Empringham.

CART
Bourbonnais first races in a major championship were in the 1994 PPG Indy Car World Series, sanctioned by CART. The Canadian made his debut in the third round of the championship, the Grand Prix of Long Beach. The racer was entered by the short lived ProFormance Motorsports which existed only throughout 1993 and 1994 entering, Scott Pruett, John Paul, Jr. and Bourbonnais. His debut was short cut by a broken exhaust in his Chevrolet powered Lola T93/00 after 24 laps.

Later in the season Bourbonnais returned with McCormack Motorsports. The driver suffered a single car crash at Toronto. Technical difficulties prevented finishes for Bourbonnais at Mid-Ohio, Vancouver and Road America.

Indy Lights
Bourbonnais ran a partial season in Indy Lights with Forsythe Racing in 1995. After some mediocre results the Canadian scored a second place at New Hampshire International Speedway in a Buick powered Lola T93/20. The Canadian ran a full season with the American racing team in Indy Lights the following year. His racing season started with disappointed. A practice crash at Homestead-Miami Speedway left Bourbonnais with a concussion. Therefore he missed the opening race of the season. Bourbonnais returned at Long Beach placing seventh. The following round, at Nazareth Speedway the Canadian scored his first pole position in the series. However, mechanical issues prevented a strong finish. The second half of the 1996 Indy Lights season Bourbonnais was very strong. The Quebec racer scored a number of podium finishes. He even won the Indy Lights race at Vancouver. The racing driver finished fourth in the drivers championship.

Bourbonnais ran a partial season in 1997 with Eclipse Racing not scoring notable results.

Indy Racing League
Throughout his racing career, Bourbonnais made attempts at the Indy 500. His first start was the 1997 Indy 500. The legendary race was run over three days due to rain delays. After a practice crash the Blueprint Racing team had to work hard to get Bourbonnais in the race. In a last chance qualifying session the Canadian qualified his car in 32nd place.

Bourbonnais, along with Paul Durant, Robby Gordon, Sam Schmidt and Jim Guthrie, were granted extra practice laps. Due to engine troubles in earlier sessions the drivers made extra system checks. Engine troubles haunted Bourbonnais during the race. The Canadian survived a chaotic race start which took out five drivers before the start of the race. However, starting lap eight, the Oldsmobile Aurora V8 in Bourbonnais' Dallara IR7 blew. As he stopped down the backstretch his stop caused a yellow flag.

In 1998 Bourbonnais made a second attempt at the Indy 500 with BLueprint Racing. Struggling for speed the Canadian had to qualify on Bump day in order to make the race. Bourbonnais (and also Lyn St. James and Dan Drinan) failed to beat Johnny Unser's time to make the race.

Post-single-seater racing career
Besides single-seaters, Bourbonnais has raced in sportscars and GT's. In 1998 the Canadian joined Mike Davies and Bill Dollahite to race a Ferrari 333 SP in the 6 hours of Watkins Glen. The mainly amateur based team finished on an impressive tenth place overall, eighth in class. For 2000 Bourbonnais joined Philip Creighton Motorsports at the Grand-Am race at Trois-Rivieres. Together with teammate Scott Schubot the team finished fourth overall in a Lola B2K/10.

In 2003 Bourbonnais returned for a one-off in the Trans-Am Series. Bourbonnais replaced Paul Gentilozzi at Rocketsports Racing for the race at Trois-Rivieres. The Canadian rookie qualified his Jaguar XKR in third place, finishing the race in fifth.

Political career
In 2018 he began a career in politics by being a candidate for the Coalition Avenir Québec during the 2018 Quebec general election in Vaudreuil (provincial electoral district) where he finished 2nd.

Racing record

SCCA National Championship Runoffs

Complete International Formula 3000 results
(key)

24 Hours of Le Mans results

American open–wheel racing results
(key) (Races in bold indicate pole position)

Toyota Atlantic Championship

CART

Indy Lights

Indy Racing League

References

External links
Driver Database Profile
Official Website

1965 births
Racing drivers from Quebec
Living people
Champ Car drivers
Indianapolis 500 drivers
IndyCar Series drivers
Indy Lights drivers
Atlantic Championship drivers
24 Hours of Le Mans drivers
International Formula 3000 drivers
British Formula 3000 Championship drivers
Trans-Am Series drivers
World Sportscar Championship drivers
SCCA National Championship Runoffs winners